Solodov is a Russian masculine surname, its feminine counterpart is Solodova. It may refer to

Gennady Solodov (born 1934), Russian racewalker 
Viktor Solodov (born 1962), Russian weightlifter

References

Russian-language surnames